Shrinivas Vanga is an Indian politician serving as Member of the State Maharashtra Legislative Assembly from Palghar Vidhan Sabha constituency as a member of Balasahebanchi Shiv Sena

Positions held
 2019: Elected to Maharashtra Legislative Assembly

References

External links
  Shivsena Home Page 

Members of the Maharashtra Legislative Assembly
Living people
Shiv Sena politicians
Year of birth missing (living people)